Garlic sausage is a type of meat sausage prepared using garlic as a primary ingredient. It is prepared using pork or beef/veal, or a combination of pork and beef. It can be prepared using fresh or dried garlic, including dried granulated garlic.

Garlic sausage is a part of French cuisine. In the United States, knackwurst, also referred to as knoblauch, is prepared using ground pork, veal, and fresh garlic.

See also

 List of garlic dishes
 List of sausages

References

Further reading
 
 Kozačinski, L.; Hadžiosmanović, M.; Fleck, Ž. Cvrtila; Zdolec, N.; Filipović, I.; Kozačinski, Z. (March 2008). "Quality of dry and Garlic Sausages from Individual Households". MESO. Vol. 10 Issue 1. pp. 74-80.

External links
 "Saucissons a l'Ail (French garlic sausages)". The New York Times.

Garlic dishes
Sausages